Dangjin is a city in South Chungcheong Province, 
South Korea.  It stands on the south shore of the Bay of Asan.  Dangjin borders Incheon, Pyeongtaek, and Hwaseong by sea, and Seosan, Yesan, and Asan by land.  Its name means "Tang ferry," and refers to the historic role of Dangjin's harbor in connecting Korea to the other side of the Yellow Sea.   This role continues to be important in the city's economy, which relies on a mixture of agriculture and heavy industry. The city has the same Hanja name (唐津市) as Karatsu in Saga Prefecture, Japan.

Administrative divisions

The city is divided into 2 eup, 9 myeon and 3 dong.

History
The name "Dangjin" was first used to refer to this area during the Joseon Dynasty.  From 1413 to 1895, it was known as Dangjin-hyeon, a division of Chungcheong Province.  The city achieved its present borders in 1973, with the merger of a portion of Jeongmi-myeon into Seosan's Unsan-myeon. It was originally a county but was promoted to a city on January 1, 2012, after a rapid population boost.

Climate
Dangjin has a humid continental climate (Köppen: Dwa), but can be considered a borderline humid subtropical climate (Köppen: Cwa) using the  isotherm.

Education
As of March 2005, in Dangjin there were 33 elementary schools, 12 middle schools, and 38 preschools, serving 14,293 students.  In addition, there were 8 high schools.  All of these organs are overseen by the Dangjin Office of Education.

The sole institution of higher education in the city is Shinsung College.

Economy
Dangjin is home to a number of factories, including steel mills operated by Hyundai Hysco and Hyundai INI Steel.  These factories are supplied in part by ships docking at Dangjin Harbor, a cargo port with 5 piers, two of which are dedicated to steel coil shipping.

Sister cities
 
 
 – Daisen, Akita, Japan

Domestic

Gangbuk-gu, Seoul
Nam-gu (Incheon)
Yongsan-gu, Seoul

References

External links
 City government website

 
Cities in South Chungcheong Province
Port cities and towns in South Korea